The Francis McIlvain House was a historic home, built in 1869, in the Logan Square neighborhood of Philadelphia. A -story brick rowhouse faced with ashlar brownstone, it  had a mansard roof in the Second Empire style.

The Francis McIlvain House was added to the National Register of Historic Places in 1979.

History
 The house was a -story brick rowhouse faced with ashlar brownstone. It had a mansard roof in the Second Empire style.

Added to the National Register of Historic Places in 1979,  the Francis McIlvain House was demolished in 2014.

References

Houses on the National Register of Historic Places in Philadelphia
Second Empire architecture in Pennsylvania
Houses completed in 1869
Logan Square, Philadelphia
1869 establishments in Pennsylvania
Demolished buildings and structures in Philadelphia
Buildings and structures demolished in 2014